Behroze Edulji (born 13 April 1950) is a former Test cricketer who represented India. Her sister Diana Edulji is also a former Indian Test cricketer.

She was among the handful few who were awarded cheque of 15 lakhs each, recognizing their contribution to Indian cricket by the BCCI.

References

1950 births
Cricketers from Mumbai
India women Test cricketers
Indian women cricketers
Living people
Mumbai women cricketers
West Zone women cricketers